Messancy is a municipality of Wallonia located in the province of Luxembourg, Belgium.

Population
On 1 January 2007 the municipality, had 7,466 inhabitants, giving a population density of 142.4 inhabitants per km2.

Area
The municipality covers 52.43 km2.

Sub-Municipalities
The municipality consists of the following districts: Habergy, Hondelange, Messancy, Sélange, and Wolkrange.

Other population centers include: Bébange, Buvange, Differt, Guelff, Longeau, and Turpange.

See also
 List of protected heritage sites in Messancy

References

External links
 

 
Municipalities of Luxembourg (Belgium)